Black Sheep is a 2006 New Zealand comedy horror film written and directed by Jonathan King. It was produced by Philippa Campbell and stars Nathan Meister, Peter Feeney, Danielle Mason, Tammy Davis, Oliver Driver, Tandi Wright, Glenis Levestam, Nick Blake, Matthew Chamberlain, Nick Fenton, Eli Kent, and Sam Clarke. The special effects were done by Weta Workshop.

The film premiered at the TIFF on 10 September 2006 as part of their Midnight Madness series. It was theatrically released in New Zealand on 29 March 2007 by the New Zealand Film Commission.

In Spain Manga Films released it on August 15, 2007, in a double-session Grindhouse lookalike after Severance.

In North America, IFC Films picked up theatrical distribution rights, and Genius Products and The Weinstein Company released on DVD via their Dimension Extreme label

Black Sheep received positive reviews from critics and grossed $5 million at the box office. It also received a Narcisse Award nomination for Best Feature Film.

Plot
A young Henry Oldfield (Nick Fenton) lives on a sheep farm in New Zealand, with his father and older brother, Angus. After witnessing his father's pride on Henry's natural ability at farming, Angus plays a cruel prank on him involving the bloody corpse of his pet sheep, just moments before Mrs. Mac, the farm's housekeeper, comes to tell the boys that their father has been killed in an accident.  The combined shock of these two incidents leads Henry to develop a crippling phobia of sheep. Fifteen years later, Henry (Nathan Meister) returns home to sell his share of the family farm to Angus (Peter Feeney). Unknown to Henry, Angus is carrying out secret genetic experiments that transform sheep from docile vegetarians into ferocious carnivores whose bite can transform a human into a bloodthirsty half-sheep monstrosity.

A pair of environmental activists named Grant (Oliver Driver) and Experience (Danielle Mason) accidentally release a mutant lamb and flee in a panic, but the lamb bites Grant and infects him. The lamb then escapes into the fields and infects other sheep. Henry and his friend Tucker (Tammy Davis) visit the farm and notice that one sheep refuses to run away. Experience steals a rifle from the car to fight off the sheep. The three soon team up to investigate the farmhouse, and they find the farmer's (Mick Rose) mutilated body. Henry sees a sheep in the hallway, and, because of his phobia, he quietly shuts the door and locks it. The sheep tries to crash through the door, and Tucker shoots the sheep. On the other end of the farm, Angus is driving around when he sees Grant. Grant bites Angus and runs off. Tucker, Experience, and Henry leave to warn Angus about the killer sheep, but a sheep hiding in the car bites Tucker. After the car is destroyed, they seek refuge in the laboratory. Henry and Tucker finally realise that Angus is conducting inhumane experiments. When one of the scientists see that Tucker's foot has now become a sheep's foot, she keeps him there for study, but Experience and Henry escape when Angus cannot bring himself to shoot his own brother.

Flocks of sheep come running down the hill toward an offal pit surrounded by a gate. Henry accidentally slips into the pit, and Angus refuses to help. Henry and Experience fall into the pit but escape in the tunnels. Meanwhile, Tucker transforms into a sheep, but the scientist administers an injection of amniotic fluid from one of the mutant lambs which transforms him back to human. But when she goes to give the shot to Angus, she gets eaten by the sheep. Angus gives a presentation to businessmen about his new genetically engineered sheep, but the businessmen are soon slaughtered by the infected sheep. When Henry and Experience try to warn Angus, they discover he has a love for sheep and leave in disgust. Henry realizes he has been infected as the mutant sheep no longer attack him or Angus; not willing to risk hurting his companion if he fully transforms, Henry kisses Experience goodbye and parts ways with her. Henry ends up fighting with his brother in a barn, who has now transformed into a gargantuan mutant sheep monster; however, only as intelligent as a sheep, Angus is kept in check by Henry and the farm's sheepdog. While he is cornered by the dog, the revolving propeller of the family plane cuts into Angus and wounds him badly. Experience and Tucker suddenly arrive and disinfect both Angus and Henry with more amniotic fluid, administered via a medicine nozzle designed for sheep. Angus, human but mad, goes back to the sheep and tells them to bite him again. The sheep, driven mad by the smell of blood, devour Angus. Eventually, all the sheep are contained and killed in a giant bonfire of ignited sheep flatulence. The cure is given to the surviving mutant sheep people, including Grant. However, the sheepdog begins bleating.

Cast
 Nathan Meister as Henry Oldfield
 Nick Fenton as Young Henry
 Peter Feeney as Angus Oldfield
 Eli Kent as Young Angus
 Danielle Mason as Experience
 Tammy Davis as Tucker
 Sam Clarke as Young Tucker
 Oliver Driver as Grant
 Tandi Wright as Dr. Astrid Rush
 Glenis Levestam as Mrs. Mac
 Nick Blake as Taxi Driver
 Matthew Chamberlain as Oliver Oldfield
 Richard Chapman as Muldoon
 Louis Sutherland as Winston
 Ian Harcourt as Brash
 James Ashcroft as Prebble
 Mick Rose as Mike
 Kevin McTurk as Weresheep

Production
Special effects for the film were handled by Weta Workshop, including participation from Richard Taylor. The film was financed in part by an investment from the Korean company Daesung Group. This was the first time a Korean company had directly invested in a New Zealand film (though Weta Workshop had previously collaborated with Korean effects houses on the South Korean film The Host).

Soundtrack
Nirvana

Release
Black Sheep premiered at the 31st Toronto Film Festival on 10 September 2006 as part of their Midnight Madness series and was released in New Zealand on 29 March 2007. Black Sheep was released on DVD and Blu-ray on 9 October 2007 by Icon Home Entertainment.

In Spain Manga Films released it on August 15, 2007, in a double-session Grindhouse lookalike after Severance. Warner Home Video (via Manga Films and its successor Vértice360) released the film on DVD on November 20,2007 and in Blu-ray on March 2014

In North America, IFC Films picked up theatrical distribution rights, and Genius Products and The Weinstein Company released on DVD via their Dimension Extreme label

Critical reception
Rotten Tomatoes, a review aggregator, reports that 72% of 96 surveyed critics gave the film a positive review; the average rating is 6.4/10. The site's consensus reads: "With an outrageous premise played completely straight, Black Sheep is a violent, grotesque, and very funny movie that takes B-movie lunacy to a delirious extreme." On Metacritic, it received a rating of 62/100 based on 17 reviews.  In a positive review, the Houston Chronicles Bruce Westbrook stated that the film combines its many influences with fresh ideas. Nigel Floyd of Time Out London rated the film 4/5 stars and called it a "treat for horror comedy fans". Philip French, writing for The Guardian, called it a "lively affair" and "full of what might be called shear terror". Andrew Pulver, also of The Guardian, was less impressed; he rated the film 2/5 and wrote that Shaun of the Dead had set the bar high for comedy horrors. Writing in The Zombie Movie Encyclopedia, Volume 2, academic Peter Dendle described it as an "excellent offering" that has zombie sheep "every bit as violent and contagious as the infected in 28 Days Later and other contemporary zombie fare".

Awards
 Silver Raven to the Brussels International Festival of Fantasy Film, in 2007.
 Special Jury Prize to the Gérardmer Film Festival, in 2007.
 Audience Prize to the Gérardmer Film Festival, in 2007.
 Best Dramatic Presentation – Long Form Award at the 2008 Sir Julius Vogel Awards for New Zealand science fiction and fantasy

References

External links 
 
 
 
 NZ On Screen page

2006 films
2006 horror films
2006 black comedy films
2006 comedy horror films
New Zealand comedy horror films
New Zealand zombie films
Natural horror films
Films set on farms
Films set in New Zealand
Films shot in New Zealand
Films about sheep
Mad scientist films
New Zealand slapstick films
New Zealand splatter films
Zombie comedy films
New Zealand science fiction films
2006 directorial debut films
2006 comedy films
Icon Productions films
2000s English-language films